Alsek Glacier is a   long glacier in Glacier Bay National Park in the Panhandle of Alaska (USA). 
The name Alsek is of Tlingit origin and may mean "place where people rest".
Glacier was named in 1901 by U.S. Navy Lieutenant Commander Moser, commander of the U.S. Bureau of Fisheries steamer USS Albatross.

Geography
The glacial feeding area is located northwest of Mount Hay on the west flank of the Fairweather Range at an altitude of 1200 m.  The 1.2 km wide glacier flows west to Alsek Lake, which forms its glacier edge lake and flows through the Alsek River.

Glacier development  
The Alsek Glacier retreated about 3.5 km in the 20th century.  As a result, the ice front split on a rock in two glacier tongues.  The lake area of Alsek Lake doubled in size in the same period.

See also
 List of glaciers in the United States

References

Glaciers of Glacier Bay National Park and Preserve
Glaciers of Hoonah–Angoon Census Area, Alaska
Glaciers of Unorganized Borough, Alaska